Chiriguaná is a city and municipality in the Department of Cesar, Colombia.

History

During the wars independence from Spain Chiriguana was part of the Province of Santa Marta. The people of the village of Chiriguana revolted against the local Spanish monarchical authorities. The Cabildo of Justice and Regiment of the Village of Chiriguana expressed to the Cabildo of Justice of Valledupar and to Maria Concepcion Lopera their efforts to support the independence cause that had begun in 1810 with the first revolt against the Spanish. Members of the Cabildo of Barrancas were Jose Pio del Rio, Braulio de Leiva, Gonzalo de Linares, Pedro Royero and Manuel J. Quintana.

Notes

References

External links
  Chiriguana official website

Municipalities of Cesar Department